The Type 98 20 mm AA machine cannon was the most common light anti-aircraft gun of the Imperial Japanese Army. It entered service in 1938 and was used until the end of World War II. After World War II this gun was used by the Indonesian Army in the Indonesian National Revolution and North Vietnam in First Indochina War.

Design and use
The Type 98 20 mm AA machine cannon was the most common light anti-aircraft gun of the Japanese military. The Type 98 designation was given to this gun as it was accepted in the year 2598 of the Japanese calendar (1938). It entered service that same year and first saw combat in Nomonhan. It was used until the end of World War II. About 80% of the Imperial Japanese Army light AA guns were Type 98s. The gun could be emplaced in about three minutes by an experienced crew or fired inaccurately from its wheels.

This weapon and its variants were based on the French design of the 13.2 mm Hotchkiss machine gun of the 1930s, which the Japanese forces had bought and further developed at home. The Type 98 was also one of the two armament options for the IJA's Submersible Gun Mount Model 1.

Ammunition
Type 100 armour piercing tracer. Weight 162 g projectile and 431 g complete round.
Type 100 high-explosive tracer (with self-destruct). Weight 136 g projectile and 405 g complete round with 890 m/s.

Variant
Two of the guns mounted together formed a variant known as the Type 4 20 mm twin AA machine cannon. Approximately 500 of these guns were produced.

See also
 20 mm AA machine cannon carrier truck
 Type 98 20 mm AA half-track vehicle
 Type 98 20 mm AAG tank
 Type 97 automatic cannon

References

Bibliography
  War Department TM-E-30-480 Handbook on Japanese Military Forces. September 1944.
 US Army field manual at hyperwar.org
 Intelligence briefing at lonesentry.com
 Japanese Artillery Weapons and Tactics, Donald B. McLean, 
 Ogata Katsuichi technological general manager of army "Matter of 13mm "Hotchkiss-type" anti-aircraft gun semi-adopted types enactment" 1934 Japan Center for Asian Historical Record Ref.C01001317200
 Army technological headquarters "Examination report of type 98 anti-aircraft gun and dummy cartridge" 1940 Japan Center for Asian Historical Record Ref.A03032139400

External links
 Taki's Imperial Japanese Army Page: Type 98 20mm AA Machine Cannon - Akira Takizawa
 Taki's Imperial Japanese Army Page: Type 4 20 mm twin AA Machine Cannon - Akira Takizawa
 "Type 100" AP and HE-T rounds at inert-ord.net

Artillery of Japan
World War II anti-aircraft guns
Anti-aircraft guns of Japan
World War II weapons of Japan
20 mm artillery
Autocannon
Military equipment introduced in the 1930s